Alexey Nikitin may refer to:
 Aleksei Nikitin,Russian footballer
 Alexey Nikitin (politician), Russian politician